Michael J. Hannafin was Professor of Instructional Technology and Director of Learning and Performance Support Laboratory at the University of Georgia. He obtained a Ph.D. in Educational Technology from the Arizona State University. Along with Kyle Peck, he developed the field of Computer Aided Instruction as distinguished from Computer Based Instruction. He received the AERA SIG- IT Best Paper Award in 2007.

Personal life
Hannafin was born on November 20, 1950 in New York. He spent his earlier life in College Point, New York before traveling to pursue his career goals. Hannafin passed away on July 26, 2020 at his home in Athens, Georgia. He is survived  by his wife, 2 children, and 6 grandchildren.

Education
Hannafin obtained a Bachelor of Science in Psychology with a Minor in Education from the Fort Hays State University in May 1972. Two years later in August 1974 he further obtained a Master's of Science in Educational/School Psychology from the same university. Seven years later, in August 1981, he completed his Ph.D. in Educational Technology.

Career and work experience
Hannafin started his career as a school Psychologist at the Northwest Kansas Educational Cooperative in Colby Kansas in 1974. In 1976 he traveled to Arizona where  he served as the school psychologist and Director of Counseling and psychological services at the Gilbert Public Schools, after which in 1979, he went on to serve as the Curriculum Director until 1981. From 1981 to 1984, Hannafin became an Assistant Professor at the University of Colorado, teaching graduate level courses in research, learning and cognition, instructional design and computer assisted instruction.

In 1985 he joined the staff of Pennsylvania State University as Associate Director of the Penn State University Regional Computer Resource Center. Two years later, he went on to become the Director for the Center for Research and Development in Education and Computing, College of Education. In 1984, he received tenure as Associate Professor in the Division of Curriculum and Instruction. His tenure at the Pennsylvania State University ended in 1989.

From 1989 until 1995, he was the director of Florida State University's Center of Instructional Development and Services, and later became a Professor in the department of Educational Research.

In 1995, Hannafin joined the University of Georgia where he was a professor and Director of the Learning and Performance Support Laboratory . In addition, he was a Charles H. Wheatley-Georgia Research Alliance Eminent Scholar of Technology – Enhanced Learning.

During the period 1992 to 1993 he served as a visiting professor at the United States Air Force Academy in the Educational Technology Center and Department of Behavioural Sciences and Leadership.

Publications

Some selected journal publications include
Shen, Y,. & Hannafin, M.J. (2013)  Scaffolding preservice teachers’ higher-order reasoning during technology integration. Journal of Technology  & Teacher Education , 21(4), 433-459
West, R., & Hannafin, M.J. (2011). Learning to design collaboratively: Participation of students designers in a community of innovation. Instructional Science, 39(6), 821-841
Kim, H., & Hannafin, M.J. (2011) Scaffolding problem solving in technology –enhanced learning environments: Bridging research and theory with practice. Computers & Education. 56(2) 403-417
Kim, M. C., & Hannafin, M. J. (2011). Scaffolding problem solving in technology-enhanced learning environments (TELEs): Bridging research and theory with practice. Computers & Education, 56(2), 403-417.
Kim, M. C., & Hannafin, M. J. (2011). Scaffolding 6th graders' problem solving in technology-enhanced science classrooms: A qualitative case study. Instructional Science, 39(3), 255-282.
Polly, D., & Hannafin, M.J. (2010).  Reexamining technology's role in learner-centred professional development. Educational Technology Research & Development, 58(5) 557-572
Hannafin, M.J., Shepherd, C., & Polly, D. (2010). Video assessment of classroom teaching practices: Lessons learned, problems & issues. Educational Technology, 50(1), 32-37.
(2009) Factors and interactions influencing technology integration during situated professional development in elementary schools. Computers in schools 26, 21-39.
Kim, M. C., Hannafin, M. J., & Bryan, L. A.  (2007). Technology-enhanced inquiry tools in science education: An emerging pedagogical framework for classroom practice. Science Education, 91(6), 1010-1030.
Hannafin, M. J., Orrill, C. H., Kim, H., & Kim, M. C. (2005). Educational technology research in postsecondary settings: Promise, problems, and prospect. Journal of Computing in Higher Education, 16(2), 3-22.
Iiyoshi, T., Hannafin, M. J., & Wang, F. (2005). Cognitive Tools and Student- Centered Learning: Rethinking Tools, Functions and Applications, Educational Media International, 42(4), 281-296.
Kim, M. C., & Hannafin, M. J. (2004). Designing online learning environments to support scientific inquiry. Quarterly Review of Distance Education, 5(1), 1-10.
Hannafin, M. J., Kim, M. C., & Kim, H. (2004). Reconciling research, theory, and practice in Web-based teaching and learning: The case for grounded design. Journal of Computing in Higher Education, 15(2), 3-20.
Hannafin, M. J., & Kim, M. C. (2003). In search of a future: A critical analysis of research on Web-based teaching and learning. Instructional Science, 31, 347-351. 
Hannafin, M.J. (1997). The technology Paradox: Or, can your horse to the moon? Access, Fall, 2,5
Hannafin, M.J., (1989) The death of educational technology has been greatly exaggerated. Canadian Journal of Educational Communication, 18,140-142
Dalton, D., Hannafin, M.J., & Hooper, S. (1989). The effects of cooperative versus individualized instructional strategies on learning from based instruction. Educational Technology Research and Development, 37,15-24
Hannafin, M,J. (1988).  Review of interactive media: Working methods and practical applications. Instructional Science, 17, 189-190
Hannafin, M. J. (1987). The effects of orienting activities, cueing, and practice on learning from computer-based instruction. Journal of Educational Research, 81, 48-53.

Some international presentations done by Hannafin include
Hannafin, M. (2009- November). Learning without instruction: Research, theory and practice in student centered learning in technology –rich environments, keynote address as the BK21- Korea Association of Educational Media International Conference, Seoul, Korea
Hannafin, M. (2008- October) student centered learning and “other-centered’ accountability: Must they be mutually exclusive? Keynote address at annual meeting of the cognition and Exploratory Learning in Digital Age (CELDA) Freiburg, Germany.
Hannafin, M. (2007- March).  Using Web- based technology to analyse and improve classroom teaching practices. Keynote address at Sultan Quaboos University, Muscat, Oman.
Hannafin, M.J. (2000- May) Technology and resource –based teaching and learning. Keynote address at the Congress on Education, Monterrey, Mexico.
Hannafin, M. J. (2000-April). The promise, peril, and performance of educational technology. Keynote address at the International Forum of the Kuwait Teacher's Society, Kuwait City.

Books
During the period 1974 to 2016 Hannafin wrote and co-authored over 84 books, chapters and monographs including the award-winning text book The Design, Development, and Evaluation of Instructional Software.  Some of his co-authors include Peck, Polly, Barrett, Cole and Wisemen. 
Some of his selected books are: 
Hannafin, M.J., Kim, H., & Chang, Y. (2014). The role of video in Web-enhanced case-based learning: Promises, Challenges and potential in teacher learning research. In Q. Lang & W. Qiyun (Eds) Designing Technology- Mediated Case Learning in Higher Education: A Global Perspective. New York: Springer.
Hannafin, M.J. (2012). Student-centered learning. In N. Seel(Ed), Encyclopedia of the sciences of learning (Part 19, 3211-3214) New York: Springer.
Hill, J. R., Domizi, D. P., Kim, M. C., & Kim, H., Hannafin, M. J.  (2007). Teaching and learning in negotiated and informal environments. In M. Moore (Ed.), Handbook of distance education (2nd ed., pp. 271—284). Mahwah, NJ: Erlbaum (now Routledge).
Kim, M. C., & Hannafin, M. J. (2007). Foundations and practice for Web-enhanced science inquiry: Grounded design perspectives. In R. Luppicini (Ed.), Online learning communities: A volume in perspectives in instructional technology and distance education (pp. 53—72). Greenwich, CT: Information Age Publishing.
Hannafin, M.J. & Hannafin K. M. (1995). The status and future of research in instructional design and technology revisited. In G. Anglin (Ed.) Readings in Instructional Technology (2nd Ed, pp. 314–321) Littleton, CO: Libraries Unlimited.
Hill, J.,Domzi, D., Kim,M., Kim, H.,& Hannafin, M.J. (2007). Teaching and learning in negotiated and informal environments. In M.Moore(Ed.), Handbook of Distance Education (2nd ED) (pp. 271–284) Mahwah, NJ: Erlbaum.
Choi, J-I., & Hannafin, M.J. (1995). Situated cognition and learning environments: Roles, structures, and implications for design. Educational Technology Research and Development.
Hannafin, M.J., Hall, C., Land, S., & Hill, J. (1994). Learning in open-ended environments: Assumptions, methods, and implications. Educational Technology, 34(8), 48-55.
Hannafin, M.J. (1992). Emerging technologies, ISD, and learning environments: Critical perspectives. Educational Technology Research and Development, 40(1), 49-63.
Hooper, S., & Hannafin, M.J. (1991). Psychological perspectives on emerging instructional technologies: A critical analysis. Educational Psychologist, 26, 69-95.
Hannafin, M.J., & Peck, K.L. (1988). The design, development, and evaluation of instructional software. New York: Macmillan.
Hannafin, M.J.(1985). Review of Mathematics Anxiety Rating Scale. In J. Mitchell (ED.), The Ninth Mental Measurements Yearbook (pp. 909–911) Buros Institute of Mental Measurements.
Peck, K.L., & Hannafin, M.J. (1987). Reconsidering technology in the classroom: Some immodest proposals. In M. Dupuis (Eds.)  Issues in Teacher Education monograph series (pp. 37–61). (Division of Curriculum Instruction, College of Education, The Pennsylvania State University).
Hannafin, M.J. (1986). Special education assessment: A systems approach. In D. Wodrich and J. Joy (Eds.), Multidisciplinary Assessment (pp. 77–108).New York: Brookes Publishing Co.

References

External links 
 http://hdl.handle.net/10919/49404

1950 births
Living people
People from Queens, New York
Fort Hays State University alumni
University of Georgia faculty
University of Colorado faculty
Florida State University faculty
Pennsylvania State University faculty